Kathy Jordan and Robin White were the defending champions but only White competed that year with Anne Smith.

Smith and White lost in the semifinals to Lise Gregory and Ronni Reis.

Gregory and Reis won in the final 6–3, 6–4 against Patty Fendick and Jill Hetherington.

Seeds
Champion seeds are indicated in bold text while text in italics indicates the round in which those seeds were eliminated.

 Patty Fendick /  Jill Hetherington (final)
 Lise Gregory /  Ronni Reis (champions)
 Anne Smith /  Robin White (semifinals)
 Lea Antonoplis /  Beth Herr (first round)

Draw

References
 1988 Northern California Open Doubles Draw

Northern California Open (tennis)
1988 WTA Tour